Highlight was a social networking application for iOS and Android created by Paul Davison. The application finds nearby users and shows things they have in common with a user. The application received a large update which introduced Android support on November 20, 2012. On April 30, 2015, the developers announced a change of focus towards social networking via photo-sharing through their Roll   app.

Criticism
Highlight has been criticized for its disclosing of private information to strangers. Highlight requires a connection to both users' Facebook accounts and their location. The difference between Highlight and other services like Foursquare is that it shares information continuously.

References

Defunct social networking services
Online companies of the United States
Internet properties established in 2012
Image-sharing websites
IOS software
Android (operating system) software